Maurice FitzGerald, 16th Knight of Kerry (c. 1734 – 24 June 1779), known as "The Dingle Knight", was an Irish politician, barrister and hereditary knight.

He was the only surviving son of John FitzGerald, 15th Knight of Kerry and his wife Margaret Deane, daughter of Joseph Deane. In 1741, he succeeded his father as Knight of Kerry. FitzGerald was Judge of the Admiralty Court and in 1761, he entered the Irish House of Commons. He sat for Dingle, the same constituency his father had represented before, until 1776.

On 10 June 1764, he married his cousin Lady Anne FitzMaurice, only daughter of William FitzMaurice, 2nd Earl of Kerry. FitzGerald died childless and was succeeded in his title by his uncle Robert. His nephew Richard Boyle Townsend became heir of his estates.

References

 (Ireland)

Irish knights
Maurice
1740s births
1779 deaths
Irish MPs 1761–1768
Irish MPs 1769–1776
Members of the Parliament of Ireland (pre-1801) for County Kerry constituencies